Bridgwater was a rural district in Somerset, England, from 1894 to 1974.

It was created in 1894 under the Local Government Act 1894.

In 1974 it was abolished under the Local Government Act 1972 becoming part of Sedgemoor.

It contained the civil parishes of Aisholt, Ashcott, Bawdrip, Bridgwater Without, Broomfield, Cannington, Catcott, Charlynch, Chedzoy, Chilton Common, Chilton Polden, Chilton Trinity, Cossington, Durleigh, East Huntspill, Eddington, Enmore, Fiddington, Goathurst, Greinton, Huntspill, Lyng, Middlezoy, Moorlinch, Nether Stowey, North Petherton, Othery, Otterhampton, Over Stowey, Pawlett, Puriton, Shapwick, Spaxton, St Michaelchurch, Stawell, Stockland Bristol, Sutton Mallet, Thurloxton, Wembdon, West Huntspill, Westonzoyland and Woolavington.

References
 Bridgwater Rural District at Britain through time
Local Government Act 1972

Districts of England created by the Local Government Act 1894
Districts of England abolished by the Local Government Act 1972
History of Somerset
Local government in Somerset
Rural districts of England